Kwasi Ameyaw-Cheremeh (born November 6, 1966) is a Ghanaian politician and member of parliament for the Sunyani East constituency in the 5th parliament of the 4th republic.

Early life and education 
Ameyaw-Cheremeh was born on November 6, 1966. He hails from Jinijini, a town in the Brong Ahafo Region of Ghana. He entered the University of Ghana and obtained his Master of Philosophy degree in Public Administration in 2008. He also attended Ghana School of Law and obtained his Bachelor of Laws in 1995. He has also attended the Galilee College in Israel and graduated with the 2008 class.

Career 
Ameyaw-Cheremeh is currently serving as the Board Chairman of Bui Power Authority. He served as the General Secretary at the National Association of Local Authorities of Ghana (NALAG). He is a Lawyer by profession.

Politics 
Ameyaw-Cheremeh is a member of the New Patriotic Party (NPP). He was elected in the 2008 Ghanaian general elections as the Member of parliament for the Sunyani East constituency for the 5th parliament of the 4th republic of Ghana. He obtained 33,765votes of 53,844 total valid votes cast, equivalent to 62.71% of total valid votes cast. He was elected over Alanyina Sampana Sampson of the People's National Convention, Justice Samuel Adjei of the National Democratic Congress, Peter Kwaw Alibah of the Democratic Freedom Party and Kwakye Kofi of the Convention People's Party. These obtained 1.25%, 34.97%, 0.29% and 0.78% respectively of all total valid votes cast. In 2012, he contested again for the Sunyani East constituency seat on the ticket of the NPP for the sixth parliament of the fourth republic and won. He served in the Parliament of Ghana for Sunyani East constituency and as the house majority chief whip. As a New Patriotic Party (NPP) member, he obtained 42,478 votes out of the 71,918 valid votes cast representing 59.06% of the total votes cast in the 2012 Ghanaian general elections.

Committees 
Ameyaw-Cheremeh is the Chairperson for the Judiciary  Committee; a member of the Standing Orders Committee; a member of the Constitutional, Legal and Parliamentary Affairs Committee; and a member of the Education Committee.

Personal life 
Ameyaw-Cheremeh is a Christian. He is married, and has four children.

References 

1966 births
Living people
Ghanaian Presbyterians
Ghanaian MPs 2009–2013
21st-century Ghanaian lawyers
Ghanaian MPs 2021–2025
New Patriotic Party politicians
Ghanaian MPs 2013–2017
Ghanaian MPs 2017–2021